Lodovico de Ferrari (2 February 1522 – 5 October 1565) was an Italian mathematician.

Biography
Born in Bologna, Lodovico's grandfather, Bartolomeo Ferrari, was forced out of Milan to Bologna. Lodovico settled in Bologna, and he began his career as the servant of Gerolamo Cardano.  He was extremely bright, so Cardano started teaching him mathematics.  Ferrari aided Cardano on his solutions for quadratic equations and cubic equations, and was mainly responsible for the solution of quartic equations that Cardano published. While still in his teens, Ferrari was able to obtain a prestigious teaching post in Rome after Cardano resigned from it and recommended him.  Ferrari retired when young at 42 years old, and wealthy. He then moved back to his home town of Bologna where he lived with his widowed sister Maddalena to take up a professorship of mathematics at the University of Bologna in 1565. Shortly thereafter, he died of white arsenic poisoning, according to a legend, by his sister.

Cardano–Tartaglia formula
In 1545 a famous dispute erupted between Ferrari and his contemporary Niccolò Fontana Tartaglia, involving the solution to cubic equations. Widespread stories that Tartaglia devoted the rest of his life to ruining Ferrari's teacher and erstwhile master Cardano, however, appear to be fabricated. Mathematical historians now credit both Cardano and Tartaglia with the formula to solve cubic equations, referring to it as the "Cardano–Tartaglia formula".

References

Further reading

External links
 
 

1522 births
1565 deaths
Scientists from Bologna
Algebraists
16th-century Italian mathematicians